Mass is a 2021 American drama film written and directed by Fran Kranz in his directorial debut. It stars Reed Birney, Ann Dowd, Jason Isaacs, and Martha Plimpton as grieving parents who meet to discuss a tragedy involving their sons. The film had its world premiere at the 2021 Sundance Film Festival on January 30, 2021, and was released on October 8, 2021, by Bleecker Street. At the BAFTA Awards, Dowd received a nomination for Best Actress in a Supporting Role.

Plot
Jay and Gail Perry are parents grieving the death of their son Evan, a victim of a high school shooting. Richard and Linda are the parents of the teenage perpetrator Hayden, who killed himself after his shootings. Six years after the tragedy, both couples agree to meet and talk in a private room at an Episcopal Church. The couples had met previously, in which Jay and Gail made hurtful comments toward Richard and Linda when they were all going through the public legal procedures that resulted from the incident. Jay had since publicly advocated for gun control and against gun ownership, causing a brief debate between him and Richard.

After talking about their sons when they were innocent children, the two couples partake in various lengthy discussions over how the tragedy had come to be and how the tragedy impacted their lives. Jay and Gail ask for information from Richard and Linda about Hayden's upbringing that they do not already know from public information about the incident. Richard and Linda tell that they knew that he became more depressed due to their family moving houses, lack of friends, and bullying at school. The couples briefly debate whether video games had influenced Hayden's violent thoughts. While acknowledging that Hayden's schools and therapists did not respond appropriately to their findings, Richard and Linda express their guilt and regret over how their failure to see and react to any signs that their son could have become violent. Jay and Gail admit that they wanted to see Richard and Linda in as much pain as they and the other victims' parents were. Richard and Linda admit that being the parents of a murderer meant that they did not know how to navigate being public figures, since they also could not speculate about why Hayden did what he did. Richard and Linda reveal that Hayden had made friends in high school, who were also victims of bullying, and that one of his friends had access to guns. Jay and Linda become furious, causing Richard to warn against jumping to conclusions about Hayden, only for Jay to speculate that Hayden was a psychopath who was incapable of being dealt with.

Jay eventually has a short angry outburst, leading to him breaking down as he describes how Evan was killed by Hayden. Both couples reflect on the other victims and their families, and when they visited the crime scene in the aftermath. Linda reveals that she found a notebook in her son's room after learning of the shooting, detailing his plans for the shooting and his suicide in the school library. She and Richard explain that while they understood that the grieving parents would not mourn the loss of Hayden, they still wanted and held a funeral to memorialize and mourn their once-innocent son who they loved before his horrible actions. Linda expresses that she wants to remember the good memories about Hayden before his actions, rather than ignoring and condemning Hayden completely. When Linda asks Gail to tell a story about Evan, Gail recounts a positive memory of Evan when he was 12 and expresses how much she and Jay miss him. Having come to an understanding of all the pain they felt, Gail forgives Richard, Linda, and Hayden, wanting to move on from all the deep pain and grief.

The couples hold hands in silence to end their meeting, all having reached a state of empathy for each other. Richard leaves first for a business meeting. Linda follows, only to come back to speak to Gail and Jay once more. Linda recounts the moment she and Richard were the most terrified of Hayden when he angrily threatened to beat her up. She confesses that she wishes she was beaten up by him so she could truly see what he became, leading Gail to comfort her before they finally part ways. Jay becomes emotional when he overhears a choir practice in another room of the church. Gail comforts him before they finally depart.

Cast
 Reed Birney as Richard
 Ann Dowd as Linda
 Jason Isaacs as Jay Perry
 Martha Plimpton as Gail Perry
 Breeda Wool as Judy
 Kagen Albright as Anthony
 Michelle N. Carter as Kendra

Production
In November 2019, it was announced that Fran Kranz would write and direct Mass in his feature directorial debut, with Reed Birney, Ann Dowd, Jason Isaacs, and Martha Plimpton attached to star. Breeda Wool joined the cast in December 2019. The film was shot over a roughly two week period in late 2019 at Emmanuel Episcopal Church in Hailey, Idaho.

Release
Mass had its world premiere at the 2021 Sundance Film Festival on January 30, 2021 in the Premieres section.  In May 2021, Bleecker Street acquired distribution rights to the film. By the end of its run, the film will have screened at film festivals in Busan, Charlottesville, London, San Sebastian, Sudbury, Woodstock and Zurich. It is scheduled to be released on October 8, 2021. In September 2021, Sky Cinema acquired the UK and Ireland distribution rights. In the United States, the film was screened in four theaters; two in New York and two in Los Angeles.

Reception

Box office
In its opening weekend, Mass earned $13,485 from four theaters.

Critical response

 The site's critics consensus reads, "Mass requires a lot of its audience, but rewards that emotional labor with a raw look at grief that establishes writer-director Fran Kranz as a filmmaker of tremendous promise." 

Kranz's direction and storytelling techniques received praise. The Chicago Reader compared the film to the works of playwright Tennessee Williams, calling it "riveting and unforgettable." Richard Whittaker from The Austin Chronicle had a similar response and said in his review that the story was "perfectly told." Writing for Little White Lies, Hannah Strong summarized the film as a "study of human pain and anger in painstaking detail, supported by a script which is hauntingly realistic without dipping into mawkish or exploitative territory." Owen Gleiberman, from Variety, said the film "announces Fran Kranz as a bold new filmmaker who has earned the right to excavate a subject as sensitive as this one."

The performances in the film also received praise. While Entertainment Weekly said it was "an exceptional opportunity to watch four great character actors," Salon.com said the film "gives each member of the ensemble cast a big speech to emote and express what their characters are feeling. The conversation is certainly compelling as it builds." In his review for The Hollywood Reporter, David Rooney said the film was "a harrowing watch, but a cathartic one, with each of the four superb principal actors delivering scenes of wrenching release." Furthermore, Vox journalist Alissa Wilkinson said Mass "leaves plenty of breathing room for characters to have authentic moments of emotion and puts a gentle, grace-filled frame around an almost unspeakable tragedy. It's a showcase for its performers, but it's also a valuable experience for its audience."

Accolades

References

External links
 
 
 Official screenplay

2021 directorial debut films
2021 drama films
2021 independent films
2020s English-language films
American drama films
American independent films
Bleecker Street films
Films about grieving
Films about parenting
Films about school violence
Films shot in Idaho
2020s American films